Ailuronyx is a small genus of geckos from Seychelles, commonly known as skin-sloughing geckos. They have a reputation for delicacy and especially for shedding strips of skin if handled.

Classification of genus Ailuronyx
Seychelles bronze gecko, A. seychellensis  
Dwarf bronze gecko, A. tachyscopaeus 
Giant bronze gecko or yellow gecko, A. trachygaster

References

 
Lizard genera
Taxa named by Leopold Fitzinger